Raaj Aashoo is an Indian music composer, singer and film director working mainly in Bollywood film industry. As a music director Raaj Aashoo has worked in Hindi films like Tera Intezaar, Romeo Akbar Walter, Luckhnowi Ishq, Sweetiee Weds NRI, Bypass Road, X Ray: The Inner Image, Tutak Tutak Tutiya, Hume Tumse Pyaar Kitna, Kaashi in Search of Ganga, Pareshaanpur and many more.

His debut Hindi film as director is Woh 3 Din starring  Sanjay Mishra, Rajesh Sharma and  Chandan Roy Sanyal in lead roles.

He is married to singer and lyricist Seepi Jha, with whom he has two daughters. Seepi recently sang and wrote lyrics for the remake of "Sabki Baaratein Aayi", whose music was directed by Raaj Aashoo.

References

External links
 
 
 
 
 Official Website

Music directors
Living people
1986 births
Hindi film score composers